Hiroto Dam  is a gravity dam located in Miyazaki Prefecture in Japan. The dam is used for flood control. The catchment area of the dam is 34.4 km2. The dam impounds about 38  ha of land when full and can store 6400 thousand cubic meters of water. The construction of the dam was started on 1969 and completed in 1993.

See also
List of dams in Japan

References

Dams in Miyazaki Prefecture